James Hilton is an English designer based in London.

He co-founded the creative agency AKQA together with Ajaz Ahmed in 1995 and over twenty years grew it to become one the world's most successful digital agencies. In 2014 Hilton left AKQA to found the experimental design studio AtelierStrange and custom motorcycle brand Death Machines of London. He joined the design company Native as their Chief Creative Officer in December 2016.

Hilton attended Southampton Solent University (then referred to as Southampton Institute of Higher Education) from 1990 to 1994.

Education
Hilton attended Southampton Solent University for four years. Firstly on a two-year OND course in Graphic Design, followed by a further two-year HND course in Graphic Design. During the HND, two 'live' pitch competitions were run for external clients; a branding assignment for a local company, and an invitation to a sponsored fashion show. Hilton won both and spent much of his second year of HND working on client projects rather than course work.

Upon completion of his HND he then applied for a degree in Graphic Design at the same college. He was denied a place on the basis that 'there's nothing more we can teach you. Get out there and start doing something'. Ironically, Hilton was then briefly employed by Southampton Solent University to teach computer aided design to degree students using the colleges first Apple Macintosh computers.

AKQA
Hilton has said that he's 'never had a proper job' and this is largely due to his joining AKQA almost straight out of college. Since co-founding AKQA in 1995 with Ajaz Ahmed, Dan Norris-Jones and Matthew Treagus, Hilton has been at the forefront of an industry which has seen the company grow to become arguably the world's most respected creative agency. Working with global clients such as Nike, Audi, Warner Brothers, Fiat, Heineken and Google, AKQA has grown into 14 offices around the world and employs over 2,500 practitioners.

Recognising the need for an awards platform specifically for full-time students, AKQA instigated the Future Lions awards program at the Cannes Lions Festival of Creativity. Future Lions is now seen as one of the most innovative and exciting seminars of the festival receiving thousands of entries every year from over 40 countries.

AKQA has garnered hundreds of international industry awards, including at least one agency of the year award every year. In 2010, AKQA took home Agency of the Year for the second year running at the Revolution Awards and Agency of the Year awards from New Media Age and the Interactive Advertising Bureau. In 2009, the company won five separate agency of the year awards, a feat unprecedented in the communications industry. AKQA's work for Fiats "eco:Drive" won them the Cannes Cyber Lion Grand Prix in 2009. In 2011 the agency scooped no less than five Cannes Lions, winning three gold Cyber Lions, one silver and one bronze. AKQA had been named Revolution's Agency of the Decade (for 1997 to 2007).

When Advertising Age's Creativity magazine created its inaugural Interactive Agency of the Year award (2006), it gave it to AKQA, recognising the agency's "global culture, creative hires and technological muscle." Said the magazine's editor, Teressa Iezzi, "We thought AKQA embodied the spirit of the big-idea-first approach."

2013 was the agency's most successful year at the Cannes Lions International Festival of Creativity to date. It won 14 Lions including a gold Cyber Lion for Nike+ Kinect Training and a Titanium and Integrated Lion for Nike "Find your greatness". In June of the same year, WPP bought a majority stake in AKQA valuing the company at $350m USD.

In 2014, AKQA won Queen's Award for Enterprise: Innovation, and was named Most Innovative Agency at 2014 Digiday Awards.

In November 2014, after completing the award-winning interior redesign of AKQA's London office, Hilton announced his departure from AKQA to found the experimental design company AtelierStrange.

AtelierStrange
James Hilton founded AtelierStrange together with architect and interior designer Darryl Amos in November 2014.

According to Hilton, the company was born out of frustration: "First, at the absence of objects that fit our particular Victorian murderer chic aesthetic" he says, "and secondly, from the belief that technology needn't look technological, and can instead harmoniously integrate within an imperfect human quality – to not only be beautifully useful, but to also become magical."

AtelierStrange publicly launched with their brand and a preview of their first product "Hyde" on 1 April 2015 on Instagram and Twitter. Although there is no official explanation to the "Since 1752" footer, it appears to be a joke relating to the exact time the company launched. Amos though appears to have left the company in October 2015.

AtelierStrange went quiet until 1 April 2016 when it simultaneously refreshed its Instagram feed and deliberately aloof website to include information relating to client work and showcasing its newest creation 'Chest of Drawers No.1'. Soon afterwards, on 7 April, Campaign magazine carried the front-page news that James Hilton had launched a branding company within AtelierStrange 'by mistake'. "I get the sense clients are becoming more frustrated by the agency circus. They get pitched by 'A' teams but find the 'B' teams working on campaigns, and then they're being sold nonsense to bolster project fees.".

It is thought that Hilton has put AtelierStrange on ice to allow him to concentrate his efforts on Native, and his custom motorcycle brand Death Machines of London.

Death Machines of London
Hilton launched the custom motorcycle brand Death Machines of London at the BikeShed Paris show in April 2016 with their Moto Guzzi Airtail. The bike, and the brand, were an immediate success and received global coverage for their imaginative take on the Moto Guzzi, and their provocative brand name.

Their second machine entitled 'Up Yours Copper' earned the brand worldwide recognition as a leader in the design and execution of custom motorcycles with coverage in Highsnobiety, British GQ and Hypebeast.

Airforce was the design house's third machine. Built in homage to Giovanni Ravelli, a WW1 fighter pilot, motorcycle racer and co-founder of Moto Guzzi, the project was inspired by the biplanes and futurist movies of his era and officially released as a celebration of his birthday. Airforce gained worldwide attention, with Designboom, the leading architecture and design culture magazine, calling it the best motorcycle design of 2018.

Native
Hilton joined the award-winning design company Native Design in December 2016.

Accolades, speaking and writing
Hilton is recognised as a world leader in design and creativity, and has collected a multitude of global awards including Grand Prix and Gold Cannes Lions, and has also served as a judge for Cannes Lions, Webby Awards, D&AD, and as Jury Chairman for the Clio Awards and EuroBest. He is also an executive member of The International Academy of Digital Arts and Sciences, an intellectually diverse, invitation-only organisation whose members include David Bowie, Francis Ford Coppola, Richard Branson, and "Simpsons" creator Matt Groening.

In 2010, Hilton was appointed into the Creativity 50, a list of the world's fifty most influential and inspiring creative personalities in which Hilton was named alongside Jonathan Ive and Lady Gaga.

In 2011, 2012 and 2013, he was named as the UK's number one digital creative director, and AKQA 'Agency of the Year' by Campaign magazine in the UK, and AdWeek in the US. AKQA have now been awarded this title more times, on both sides of the Atlantic, than any other agency in history.

Hilton is one of the most sought-after international speakers on the subjects of brands, creativity and inspiration, and has conducted talks at universities and schools of creativity across the world including Oxford University, BCIT and twice at TEDx. Hilton is also Visiting Professor at Southampton Solent University.

As a writer and columnist, Hilton has contributed to books on creativity and thought leadership including Velocity, which he also designed, and Spark For The Fire. He writes for the magazine Campaign and is a regular columnist for Shots.

Personal life
Hilton lives in Dulwich, South London.

External links
Death Machines of London official website
Death Machines of London on Instagram
AtelierStrange's official website
AtelierStrange on Instagram
James Hilton on Twitter
AKQA's official website
Native's official website

References

1973 births
Living people
Alumni of Solent University
English furniture designers
British industrial designers
English graphic designers
British graphic designers